Gamin Qaleh (also Romanized as Gamīn Qal‘eh; also known as Gomī Qal‘eh, Jam Qal‘eh, Khamghala, Qīam Qal‘eh, and Qiyām Qal‘eh) is a village in Gol Tappeh Rural District, Gol Tappeh District, Kabudarahang County, Hamadan Province, Iran. At the 2006 census, its population was 657, in 162 families.

References 

Populated places in Kabudarahang County